Becky Lee (born 11 August 1978) is a Hong Kong TVB actress and host. She also is a vocal music artist. She graduated from the Music Department of Hong Kong Baptist University, majored in vocal music.

Filmography

TV series

Film
The Fortune Buddies (2011) as Model

References

External links
 

1978 births
Living people
Hong Kong female models
Hong Kong television actresses
TVB actors
21st-century Hong Kong actresses
Alumni of Hong Kong Baptist University